The 2017 World Women's Curling Championship (branded as CPT World Women's Curling Championship 2017 for sponsorship reasons) was a curling event held between March 18–26 at the Capital Indoor Stadium in Beijing, China. The winning Rachel Homan rink from Canada was the first team to go through a women's world championship undefeated since the event began in 1979, winning 13 games through the round robin, playoffs and final. Runners-up Russia took their first silver medal on this event.

Qualification
The following nations are qualified to participate in the 2017 World Women's Curling Championship:
 (host country)
Two teams from the Americas zone
 
 (winner of the 2017 Americas Challenge)
Eight teams from the 2016 European Curling Championships

 (winner of the World Challenge Games)
One team from the 2016 Pacific-Asia Curling Championships

Teams

WCT ranking
Year to date World Curling Tour order of merit ranking for each team prior to the event.

Round-robin standings
Final round-robin standings

Round-robin results
All draw times are listed in China Standard Time (UTC+8).

Draw 1
Saturday, March 18, 13:00

Draw 2
Saturday, March 18, 19:00

Draw 3
Sunday, March 19, 9:00

Draw 4
Sunday, March 19, 14:00

Draw 5
Sunday, March 19, 19:00

Draw 6
Monday, March 20, 9:00

Draw 7
Monday, March 20, 14:00

Draw 8
Monday, March 20, 19:00

Draw 9
Tuesday, March 21, 9:00

Draw 10
Tuesday, March 21, 14:00

Draw 11
Tuesday, March 21, 19:00

Draw 12
Wednesday, March 22, 9:00

Draw 13
Wednesday, March 22, 14:00

Draw 14
Wednesday, March 22, 19:00

Draw 15
Thursday, March 23, 9:00

Draw 16
Thursday, March 23, 14:00

Draw 17
Thursday, March 23, 19:00

Playoffs

1 vs. 2
Friday, March 24, 19:00

3 vs. 4
Saturday, March 25, 14:00

Semifinal
Saturday, March 25, 19:00

Bronze medal game
Sunday, March 26, 10:00

Gold medal game
Sunday, March 26, 15:00

Statistics

Top 5 player percentages
After Round Robin; minimum 5 games

Perfect games

References
General

Specific

World Women's Curling Championship
March 2017 sports events in Asia
2010s in Beijing
2017 in women's curling
Sports competitions in Beijing
2017 in Chinese women's sport
Qualification tournaments for the 2018 Winter Olympics
International curling competitions hosted by China
Women's curling competitions in China